John Aitpillah is a Ghanaian politician and a member of the first Parliament of the fourth Republic representing the Ellembelle Constituency in the Western Region of Ghana.

Early life
William Kwaku Asante was born in Ellembelle in the Western region of Ghana.

Politics
He was first elected into Parliament on the ticket of the National Democratic Congress for the Ellembelle constituency during the 1992 Ghanaian general elections.

Career
He is a former member of Parliament for the Ellembelle constituency from 1993 to 1997. He served only one term as the member of Parliament for the constituency. He was also a district chief executive and  a teacher in Axim.

Personal life and death.
He is a Christian. Aitpillah died at age 81 on  September 21, 2005.

References

Living people
Year of birth missing (living people)
National Democratic Congress (Ghana) politicians
People from Western Region (Ghana)
Ghanaian MPs 1993–1997
Ghanaian Christians
Ghanaian educators